Elena Boeva is a Bulgarian model and actress based in New York, USA. Boeva came to India to participate in the dance reality show Nach Baliye 5 on Star Plus as the partner of Kushal Tandon. She has been participating in many international projects, such as TV commercials, movies, TV and reality shows in USA, Bulgaria, India and Turkey.

Television shows

Movies
 2012 Lake Placid: The Final Chapter as Tina
 2013 Taken: The Search for Sophie Parker as U.S. Envoy

References 

Living people
Female models from New York (state)
New York Film Academy alumni
Year of birth missing (living people)
Bulgarian emigrants to the United States
21st-century American women